Xiushan Tujia and Miao Autonomous County, or Xiushan County for short, is located in the southeast of Chongqing Municipality, China. It is the municipality's southernmost county-level division.

 Area: 
 Population:  (2006)

Climate

References

External links 
 Government Webpage

 
Miao autonomous counties
County-level divisions of Chongqing
Tujia autonomous counties